is a Japanese manga series by Hiromu Arakawa, based on the original novel series of the same name written by Yoshiki Tanaka. It has been serialized in Kodansha's Bessatsu Shōnen Magazine since July 2013. The manga is licensed for English release in North America by Kodansha USA.

A 25-episode anime television series adaptation by Liden Films and Sanzigen was broadcast in Japan on MBS from April to September 2015, followed by an 8-episode series, titled The Heroic Legend of Arslan: Dust Storm Dance, broadcast from July to August 2016. The anime series is licensed in North America by Funimation.

Plot

Media

Manga

The manga adaptation of Yoshiki Tanaka's The Heroic Legend of Arslan by Hiromu Arakawa was announced by Kodansha's shōnen manga magazine Bessatsu Shōnen Magazine in May 2013; the series started in the magazine on July 9 of the same year. In March 2023, it was announced that the series entered its "final decisive battle." Kodansha has collected its chapters into individual tankōbon volumes. The first volume was released on April 9, 2014. As of December 9, 2022, eighteen volumes have been released.

In North America, the manga was digitally published in English by Crunchyroll Manga from 2014 until 2018, when the company announced that they would no longer publish manga from Kodansha. Kodansha USA began publishing the manga in print and digital format on August 19, 2014.

Anime

An anime television series was announced in November 2014. The series is directed by Noriyuki Abe, with scripts by Makoto Uezu. The series aired from April 5 to September 27, 2015 on MBS's Nichigo timeslot and other Japan News Network stations. An original animation DVD (OAD) was bundled with the manga's fifth limited edition volume, released on May 9, 2016.

In North America, Funimation announced the license to the series in April 2015, and began a broadcast dub in June of the same year.

An 8-episode second season, titled , aired from July 3 to August 21, 2016. Another OAD was bundled with the manga's sixth limited edition volume, which released on November 9, 2016.

Video game

A Musou crossover game developed by Koei Tecmo, titled  , was released on PlayStation 3 and PlayStation 4 in Japan on October 1, 2015. The game was released in North America on February 9, 2016 and in Europe on February 12.

Reception

Manga
Alongside How Are You?, The Heroic Legend of Arslan ranked 17th on Takarajimasha's Kono Manga ga Sugoi! list of best manga of 2015 for male readers. The manga ranked 8th on "Nationwide Bookstore Employees' Recommended Comics of 2015" by the Honya Club online bookstore. The series was nominated for the 42nd Kodansha Manga Award in the shōnen category in 2018. The series ranked 35th on Da Vinci magazine's 17th annual "Book of the Year" 2017 list and ranked 45th on the magazine's 19th 2019 list.

Sales
As of June 2018, The Heroic Legend of Arslan manga had 5.5 million copies in circulation. The 3rd volume of the series was Kodansha's #11 manga volume with biggest first printings from the period between April 2014 and March 2015, with 370,000 copies in circulation. The 7th volume of the series was Kodansha's #6 manga volume with biggest first printings from the period between April 2017 and March 2018, with 358,000 copies in circulation. The 11th volume of the series was Kodansha's #8 manga volume with biggest first printings from the period between April 2019 and March 2020, with 265,000 copies in circulation.

Critical reception
Kate O'Neil of The Fandom Post ranked the first volume of the manga as B+, and wrote: "Arslan has an appropriately dark start for a story about war. The action is strong, vicious and bloody. The stakes in the war are high, with death all around the young prince and his loyal retainer. It’s a solid start to what will hopefully turn out to be an excellent tale. While the leads haven’t grabbed me yet there’s plenty of time to develop them further". Rebecca SIlverman of Anime News Network gave the first volume a B and wrote: "If you enjoy an epic fantasy with plenty of historical detail and battle scenes and don't mind waiting for the story to really get going, The Heroic Legend of Arslans first volume is worth reading".

Anime
Theron Martin of Anime News Network ranked the anime series as B. Martin called The Heroic Legend of Arslan "a cross between Yona of the Dawn and Guin Saga", and said that the series is "often most interesting when focusing on anyone but Arslan himself". Martin concluded: "The Heroic Legend of Arslan is an ambitious series, inviting plenty of discussion about slavery and religion and politics in general. While its first half has its flaws, if you are looking for an epic fantasy story largely free of romantic distractions, then you could definitely do a lot worse".

References

External links
 
 

2013 manga
2015 anime television series debuts
2016 anime television series debuts
Films with screenplays by Makoto Uezu
Funimation
High fantasy anime and manga
Hiromu Arakawa
Historical fantasy anime and manga
Kodansha manga
Liden Films
Mainichi Broadcasting System original programming
Manga based on novels
NBCUniversal Entertainment Japan
Persian mythology in popular culture
Sanzigen
Shōnen manga
TBS Television (Japan) original programming
War in anime and manga